The Highland Railway Jones Goods class was a class of steam locomotive, and was notable as the first class with a 4-6-0 wheel arrangement in the British Isles. Fifteen were built, and one has survived to preservation. Originally known as the Big Goods class, they became class I under Peter Drummond's 1901 classification scheme.

Fifteen locomotives were built by Sharp, Stewart and Company and delivered between September and November 1894, numbered 103 to 117. At the time, these were the most powerful main line engines in the country. Originally intended principally as freight engines, they were often called upon for passenger duties during the wide fluctuations of traffic which occurred on the Highland Railway, particularly during the summer season.

Overview
The 4-6-0 wheel arrangement had its origins in the United States, and its introduction to Britain was the work of the Highland Railway's locomotive superintendent David Jones. When the 'Jones Goods' first appeared they were felt to be somewhat daring as they were such an advance on anything that Jones or the Highland Railway had previously built.

Although the type was a notable success for Jones, an accident while testing one of the locomotives caused one of his legs to be severely scalded. Although he recovered, he was permanently affected and by the end of December 1896 had retired due to ill-health.

Dimensions
Boiler pressure was  — the previous highest on the Highland being . Additionally the boiler and chassis were significantly longer than anything previously attempted by the company. It was also the first tender locomotive for the railway not to have Allan double frames and inclined cylinders beside the smokebox.

Transfer to LMS
The class was numbered 17916–17930 and given power classification '4F' by the London, Midland and Scottish Railway (LMS). They were withdrawn between 1929 and 1940.

Preservation
The first of the class, Number 103, (LMS 17916) was set aside for preservation by the LMS in 1934. It was restored to working order by British Railways in 1959 and spent several years operating enthusiasts' tours. During this time, it appeared in the 1965 film Those Magnificent Men in their Flying Machines, playing the part of a French locomotive, complete with NORD lettering on the tender. It was finally retired in 1966 and is today in the Glasgow Museum of Transport. In addition to being the first ever British 4-6-0, no. 103 has since 1966 also had the less positive distinction of being the only former Highland Railway locomotive still in existence.

Models
On February 25, 2022, Rapido Trains UK announced a model of the Jones Goods for OO Scale. They will be offering liveries from across the class's lifespan, including Number 103 as preserved.

References 

 
 
 

 Vallance, H. A. (1938). The Highland Railway

External links 
 http://www.users.globalnet.co.uk/~emgeedee/jones.htm

Jones Goods
4-6-0 locomotives
Sharp Stewart locomotives
Railway locomotives introduced in 1894
Standard gauge steam locomotives of Great Britain
Freight locomotives